KFUM Jämtland Basket is a basketball club founded in based in Östersund, Sweden. Founded in 1956, the team plays in the Swedish Basketball League (SBL), the Swedish top basketball league. Home games are played in the Östersunds Sporthall, which has a capacity for 1,700 people.

The club also has a women's team playing at the highest national level.

History 
The team was previously named the Jämtland Ambassadors before the organisation went bankrupt in 1998. The team was re-founded under its current name Jämtland Basket. They played a couple of seasons in the second-tier Basketettan before promoting back in 2000.

In the 2021–22 season, Jämtland had its best performance in club history as they reached the finals of the Swedish Basketball League for the first time after beating Köping Basket in the quarter-finals and Södertälje BBK in the semi-finals. In the finals, They lost to Norrköping Dolphins, 2–4.

In May 2022, Jämtland announced it would be making its European debut in the FIBA Europe Cup, having qualified as Swedish runner-up. They were placed in the qualifying rounds.

Identity 
The club colours are blue and white and the logo features a basketball and a moose, an animal common in Sweden. The mascot of the team is Bruce the Moose.

Players

Notable players 
 Craig Hodges
 Marcus Liberty
/ Marshall Nelson
 Jaan Puidet
 Evariste Shonganya
 Nikolas Tomsick
/ R. T. Guinn

Coaches 

  Adnan Chuk: (2020–present)

References

External links
Official website

Basketball teams established in 1956
Basketball teams in Sweden
Sport in Östersund
1956 establishments in Sweden